Ashok Kumar Agrawal is an Indian politician from Bihar belonging to the Bharatiya Janata Party. He is a member of the Bihar Legislative Council since 2009 representing Katihar Local Authorities constituency. He was an aspirant for Katihar Lok Sabha constituency in 2019 election and had even filed nomination as Independent candidate. However he later withdrew his nomination.

References

Members of the Bihar Legislative Council
People from Katihar district
1962 births
Living people
Bharatiya Janata Party politicians from Bihar